Gary Shapiro could refer to: 

Gary J. Shapiro, American business executive
Gary Shapiro (journalist), American newspaper writer

See also
Gerald Shapiro (disambiguation)